Hypersara is a genus of parasitic flies in the family Tachinidae.

Species
Intrapales hirsuta Mesnil, 1977
Intrapales insularis Mesnil, 1977
Intrapales remotella Villeneuve, 1938

References

Diptera of Africa
Exoristinae
Tachinidae genera
Taxa named by Joseph Villeneuve de Janti